Harold Primat (born 12 June 1975) is a French-born Swiss racing driver who previously competed in the Blancpain Endurance Series and other long-distance events such as the Bathurst 12 Hour and Nurburgring 24 Hours.

Early career 
The nephew of motorcycle racer Claude Vigreux, Primat began his career in karts before graduating to the Max Mygale and Winfield racing schools in France, as well as the Jim Russell Centre in the UK.

He then moved to the US, where he competed in the Formula Ford 2000 championship. He then moved on to the British Formula Three Championship and later the F3 Euroseries, before concluding his single-seater career in World Series Lights with the Saulnier team.

During 2003 and 2004, Primat combined his single-seater races with endurance racing. Debuting in 2003 with the Saulnier team, he competed in the V de V Endurance championship, leading his maiden race at Spa until a mechanical failure put him out of the race. Primat became vice-champion in his second season, narrowly missing out on the title after a prior World Series Lights commitment forced him to skip a race.

Top-flight endurance racing 

Moving to the top level of endurance racing with Kruse Motorsport in 2005, Primat qualified third and finished second in class at the 12 Hours of Sebring event. Remaining with Kruse on the other side of the Atlantic, Primat began the European season at Spa but retired due to engine problems. He then switched to Rollcentre Racing, which allowed him to compete for overall honours in the LMP1 category, and went on to achieve three top-ten finishes in his debut year.

2005 also saw Primat make his maiden appearance at the Le Mans 24 Hours. After qualifying in 13th, the Rollcentre Dallara-Nissan suffered technical problems in the early stages of the race, resulting in the team not being classified.

Primat switched teams for 2006, becoming part of an all-Swiss line-up in the new Swiss Spirit outfit, under his former boss Serge Saulnier, whose team ran the programme. Primat won top 3 finishes at Spa and Jarama, finishing in joint-fourth place in the championship overall. However he was again unable to complete the Le Mans 24 Hours after gearbox problems forced him into retirement on lap 132.

He again mixed his European schedule with some US-based races in 2006, finishing third at Laguna Seca and fourth at Petit Le Mans for the Creation Autosportif team. However, his debut at the blue riband Daytona 24 Hours was thwarted by an engine failure on his Spirit of Daytona Crawford-Pontiac.

In 2007 Primat signed for Henri Pescarolo's eponymous team. A podium finish at Spa was his best result in the face of increased competition from the works Peugeot squad, but Primat finished in the top six at four of the six races. The season also saw him finish Le Mans for the first time, finishing sixth in class and 13th overall despite losing 90 minutes in the pits to an oil leak.

Remaining with Pescarolo Sport for the 2008 Le Mans Series, Primat had a top-three finish at Monza, despite the addition of the factory Audi squad to the LMS field. Primat also took a best-yet seventh-place finish at Le Mans, which placed him first among the unofficial 'petrol' class, beaten only by the diesel machines of sportscar heavyweights Audi and Peugeot.

In January 2009 Harold was confirmed as an Aston Martin Racing factory driver for the brand's first return to top-class endurance racing since 1989. Partnering Darren Turner, he finished fourth in the Le Mans Series standings, including a second position at the Nürburgring. Primat was joined by Peter Kox and Stuart Hall for Le Mans, where a water leak curtailed the #009 Lola-Aston Martin's involvement after 252 laps. The highlight of Primat's season was victory alongside Stefan Mücke at the inaugural Asian Le Mans Series race at Okayama in late autumn.

2010 saw Primat again driving for Aston Martin Racing, recording three podium finishes in the ALMS and LMS. Sixth place overall at Le Mans itself also represented his best finish at the French race to date. A third season with AMR in 2011, this time alongside Turner and Mücke, produced two more top three finishes for Primat, including an outright ALMS victory at Laguna Seca. Aston Martin's new, open-top AMR-One proved unreliable however, prompting the team to withdraw from the LMP1 ranks at the end of the year.

Primat then moved to privateer LMP1 outfit Rebellion Racing for the newly revived FIA World Endurance Championship in 2012. With Audi and Toyota's factory entries winning all eight rounds between them, it was left to Rebellion to fight for the LMP1 Trophy against Strakka, JRM and OAK Racing. Two victories by Primat - at Silverstone and Shanghai - brought the trophy to Rebellion.

In 2013 Primat swapped sports-prototype for GT machinery as part of Phoenix Racing's Blancpain Endurance Series, VLN and Bathurst 12 Hour driver roster. Piloting an Audi R8 LMS ultra, Primat took fourth place at the Australian classic despite losing four laps to repairs, and achieved the same result at the blue riband 24 Hours of Spa. Racing alongside Oliver Jarvis and Christopher Hasse, the Belgian event saw the trio deliver a comeback drive that ranked among the highlights of the 24 hour contest. Primat also found success on the VLN scene, picking up several top-three finishes.

On 16 September 2015, Primat announced his retirement from racing, ending his seventeen year long career. Primat retired after the final round of the 2015 Blancpain Endurance Series season, at the Nürburgring. He said that "now is the right time to begin a fresh chapter in life by focusing on other projects".

Racing record

Complete 24 Hours of Le Mans results

Complete FIA World Endurance Championship results

Post-Racing Career 
Since 2016 Primat invested in multiple Startups, amongst others in UK-based companies Playbrush and Busuu as well as Austrian-based Tractive.

References

External links 
 Official Harold Primat website

1975 births
Living people
Swiss racing drivers
24 Hours of Le Mans drivers
European Le Mans Series drivers
American Le Mans Series drivers
FIA World Endurance Championship drivers
Blancpain Endurance Series drivers
24 Hours of Spa drivers
Asian Le Mans Series drivers
U.S. F2000 National Championship drivers
Aston Martin Racing drivers
Rebellion Racing drivers
Pescarolo Sport drivers
Phoenix Racing drivers
OAK Racing drivers
Nürburgring 24 Hours drivers